Makolopetsane is a community council located in the Maseru District of Lesotho. Its population in 2006 was 7,415.

Villages
The community of Makolopetsane includes the villages of: 
 
 Aupolasi
 Boreipala
 Ha Abele
 Ha Hlabana
 Ha Hlabathe
 Ha Jeremia
 Ha Joele
 Ha John
 Ha Khomo
 Ha Kobeli
 Ha Kubeletsane
 Ha Labane
 Ha Labane (Lifateng)
 Ha Lebitsa
 Ha Lekhetho (Motenalapi)
 Ha Lekula
 Ha Libete
 Ha Litokelo
 Ha Mahlako
 Ha Makhele
 Ha Mankotseng
 Ha Matekoanyane
 Ha Mocheko
 Ha Mohapinyane
 Ha Mohloka
 Ha Molelle
 Ha Monakalali
 Ha Moroke
 Ha Motšoane
 Ha Mpeli
 Ha Nchemane
 Ha Ngoateng
 Ha Peiso
 Ha Ponto
 Ha Qamako
 Ha Rakibolane
 Ha Ralobisi
 Ha Ramahaheng
 Ha Sekhotsoa
 Ha Setipe
 Ha Tlhabi
 Ha Tšele
 Joala-Bobe
 Khalahali
 Khatleng
 Khilibiting
 Khubetsoana
 Lebohang
 Lehahaneng
 Lekhalong
 Letsatseng
 Liotsanyaneng
 Liphokoaneng
 Lithakong
 Lithubeng
 Mabeleteng
 Mainyatso
 Makhalong
 Makokong
 Malimong
 Malitsenyane
 Malumeng
 Mapatane
 Masaleng (Ha Taniele)
 Masianokeng
 Matebeleng
 Matsatseng
 Matsiring
 Mauteng
 Meeling
 Moeaneng (Ha Seng)
 Mokhoabong
 Mokoallong
 Motiaputseng
 Motse-Mocha (Ha Taniele)
 Mpatana
 Nkoeng
 Phatlalla
 Phororong
 Polateng
 Ramonaheng
 Sebala-Makhulo
 Sebusi
 Sekhutlong
 Sekokong
 Sethamahane
 Songoanyane
 Taung
 Terae Hoek
 Thabang
 Thibella
 Thotaneng
 Tiping 
 Tlokoeng

References

External links
 Google map of community villages

Populated places in Maseru District